Protomelas macrodon is a species of cichlid endemic to Lake Malawi where it is only known from areas vegetated with Vallisneria.  This species can reach a length of  SL.

References

macrodon
Fish of Lake Malawi
Fish of Malawi
Fish described in 1989
Taxonomy articles created by Polbot